The West Coast Conference (WCC) Men's Basketball Player of the Year is a basketball award given to the most outstanding men's basketball player in the West Coast Conference. The award was first given following the conference's inaugural 1952–53 season, when it was known as the California Basketball Association. The only season in which the award was not presented was the conference's second season of 1953–54. There have been six ties in the award's history, most recently in 2022–23 between Brandin Podziemski of Santa Clara and Drew Timme of Gonzaga. There have also been 13 repeat winners, but only one—Bill Cartwright of San Francisco—has been Player of the Year three times.

Four schools in the West Coast Conference have dominated the total awards distribution. Before 2000, Pepperdine, San Francisco and Santa Clara had earned the bulk of the awards. Since then, Gonzaga has had the overwhelming majority of selections. In the 23 seasons from 2000–01 to the present, coinciding with the Bulldogs' rise to national prominence, Gonzaga players have won or shared the award 17 times. Gonzaga now claims the most awards with 20 and most individual winners with 18. Santa Clara is second in awards with 12, and its nine individual winners give it a share of second place in that category with Pepperdine. The next closest school, Saint Mary's, has eight awards. One current member has yet to have a winner (Portland).

Key

Winners

Winners by school

Footnotes
The University of the Pacific left in 1971 to join its football team in the Pacific Coast Athletic Association (PCAA), now known as the Big West Conference. Pacific had been a charter PCAA member for football only in 1969. The school, which dropped football in 1995, rejoined the WCC in 2013.
Seattle University left in 1980 to become an NAIA school. It has since rejoined the NCAA, first as a Division II school and now in Division I, and is now a member of the Western Athletic Conference (WAC).
The University of Nevada, Las Vegas (UNLV) left in 1975 to become a Division I independent. UNLV is now a member of the Mountain West Conference (MW).
 California State University, Fresno, more commonly known as Fresno State, spent two seasons as a dual member of the California Collegiate Athletic Association (CCAA) and the then-WCAC. The Bulldogs returned to exclusive CCAA membership in 1957, and are now in the MW.
 The University of Nevada, Reno (Nevada) left in 1979 for the Big Sky Conference. The Wolf Pack are now in the MW.
 San Jose State University left in 1969 to become a founding member of the PCAA. The Spartans are now in the MW.
 The University of California, Santa Barbara left in 1969 to become a founding member of the PCAA. Apart from a two-year stint in the mid-1970s in which they were independent, the Gauchos have remained in the PCAA/Big West to this day.

References

NCAA Division I men's basketball conference players of the year
Player of the Year
Awards established in 1953